Gyda Westvold Hansen (born 20 April 2002) is a Norwegian Nordic combined skier who represents IL Nansen. She became the first ever World Champion in women's Nordic combined after winning the gold medal in the inaugural World Championship race, individual normal hill/5 km, at the FIS Nordic World Ski Championships 2021. She is the 2021 World Junior Champion in individual normal hill and won the silver medal at the same event in 2019 and 2020.  Westvold Hansen was also a member of the Norwegian team that took the gold medal in the mixed team normal hill competition at the 2020 Winter Youth Olympics.

She is the cousin of cross-country skier Therese Johaug.

Career
Westvold Hansen competed in the first ever women's Nordic combined World Cup race in Ramsau on 18 December 2020. She was the leader after the ski jumping phase with her 94.5 meters jump on HS98 hill, but overtaken by Tara Geraghty-Moats in the 5 km cross-country leg and finished the race in 2nd place.

Westvold Hansen has further 5 individual victories and 15 podiums in the Nordic Combined Continental Cup. She has also competed in special ski jumping events and won 2 Continental Cup races in her career.

Nordic combined results
All results are sourced from the International Ski Federation (FIS).

World Championships
 2 medal – (2 gold)

World Cup

Season titles
 5 titles – (2 overall, 3 best jumper trophies)

Season standings

Individual podiums
 18 podiums – (18 )

References

External links

2002 births
Living people
Norwegian female Nordic combined skiers
Nordic combined skiers at the 2020 Winter Youth Olympics
Youth Olympic gold medalists for Norway
FIS Nordic World Ski Championships medalists in Nordic combined
21st-century Norwegian women